The 1994 Adelaide International, also known by its sponsored name Pure Milk Australian Men's Hardcourt Championships, was an ATP tennis tournament held in Adelaide, Australia. The tournament was part of the World Series of the 1994 ATP Tour and was held from 3 to 10 January 1994.

Yevgeny Kafelnikov won his 1st title of the year, and the 16th of his career.

Finals

Singles

 Yevgeny Kafelnikov defeated  Alexander Volkov 6–4, 6–3

Doubles

 Andrew Kratzmann /  Mark Kratzmann defeated  David Adams /  Byron Black 6–4, 6–3

References

External links
ATP – Tournament profile

Adelaide International
Next Generation Adelaide International
Hard
1990s in Adelaide
January 1994 sports events in Australia